Elton is a hamlet and civil parish in the far north of Herefordshire. It is situated on the Wigmore to Ludlow road.

The village is northeast of Leinthall Starkes and south of Pipe Aston.

National Cycle Network route 44 passes through, en route between Ludlow and Leominster.

Hamlets in Herefordshire
Civil parishes in Herefordshire